Elisabetta Picenardi (1428 - 19 February 1468) was an Italian Roman Catholic professed member of the Third order of the Servites. Picenardi was born in Mantua into a noble family and, despite pressure to wed a nobleman, insisted instead on pursuing the religious path alongside her sister.

Life
Elisabetta Picenardi was born in Mantua in 1428 to the nobleman Leonardo Picenardi and Paola Nuvoloni. Her father served as a steward of the Marquis Francesco I Gonzaga. 

Elisabetta received some formal education as a noble and received her religious education from her mother while her father instructed her in Latin. Her mother died sometime during her childhood which left her father to care for her and her sister Orsina. In her childhood she lived near the church of Saint Barnabas that the Servite Order managed. 

Her father would later pressure his daughter into entering in marriage with a noble. Both Picenardi and her sister became professed members of the Servite Third Order in 1448 and Elisabetta became noted amongst her fellow religious for her personal holiness and gentleness of spirit which prompted other women to join the Servites. She clothed herself in a hair shirt and would fasten an iron belt four fingers in width to herself which remained until her death. Picenardi recited the Divine Office and would receive the Eucharist often from Fra Barnabas who would also hear her confession. Her father died in 1465.

Her sister Orsina was married to the nobleman Bartolomeo Gorni and Picenardi lived with them from her father's death for the remainder of her life. Picenardi died in 1468. Her grave soon became a place of miracles.

Beatification
Her beatification received formal confirmation on 10 November 1804 once Pope Pius VII ratified her popular devotion.

References

External links
Saints SQPN

1428 births
1468 deaths
15th-century venerated Christians
15th-century Italian Roman Catholic religious sisters and nuns
Beatifications by Pope Pius VII
Italian beatified people
Nobility of Mantua
Servite tertiaries
Venerated Catholics